Desert Phantom is a 1936 American Western film directed by S. Roy Luby.

Cast 
Johnny Mack Brown as Billy Donovan
Sheila Bromley as Jean Haloran
Ted Adams as Salizar
Karl Hackett as Tom Jackson
Hal Price as Jim Day
Nelson McDowell as "Doc" Simpson
Charles King as Henchman Dan

External links 
 

1936 films
American black-and-white films
1936 Western (genre) films
American Western (genre) films
Films directed by S. Roy Luby
1930s English-language films
1930s American films